Simon Dean Spencer (born 10 September 1976) is an English former professional footballer who played as a midfielder. He began his career at Tottenham Hotspur and later moved to Brentford, where he made one appearance in the Football League. He was capped by England at U16 and U18 level.

Playing career

Tottenham Hotspur 
Spencer began his career in the academy at Premier League club Tottenham Hotspur and progressed to make three senior appearances for the club, all during the 1995 UEFA Intertoto Cup campaign. He departed White Hart Lane at the end of the 1996–97 season.

Brentford 
Spencer was offered a three-month trial at Second Division club Brentford during the 1997–98 pre-season and signed a one-year contract on 1 August 1997. He made his debut in a 3–0 opening day defeat to Millwall and was substituted for Ryan Denys at half time by caretaker manager Kevin Lock. He completed his first 90 minutes for the club in the following game, a League Cup first round shootout win over Shrewsbury Town. It proved to be his final appearance for the club and he failed to feature in a first team squad again. Spencer departed Griffin Park in January 1998, after negotiating a settlement on his contract.

Non-League football 
After his release from Brentford, Spencer dropped into non-League football and played for Conference club Yeovil Town and Isthmian League clubs Egham Town and Billericay Town.

International career 
Spencer was capped by England at U16 and U18 level.

Career statistics

References

External links 
 

1976 births
Living people
Footballers from Islington (district)
English footballers
English Football League players
Association football defenders
Brentford F.C. players
Tottenham Hotspur F.C. players
Yeovil Town F.C. players
National League (English football) players
Egham Town F.C. players
Billericay Town F.C. players
Isthmian League players
England youth international footballers